Te Llevas Mi Vida is the second studio album released by Los Mismos on September 23, 1997. This was the final album that featured all of the members of Los Bukis together.

Track listing

References

1997 albums
Spanish-language albums
Los Mismos albums